Chong-Karakol is a village in Osh Region of Kyrgyzstan. It is part of the Alay District. Its population was 1,812 in 2021.

Nearby villages include Kichi-Karakol, Ak-Bosogo and Chiy-Talaa.

References

Populated places in Osh Region